Údrnice is a municipality and village in Jičín District in the Hradec Králové Region of the Czech Republic. It has about 300 inhabitants.

Administrative parts
Villages of Bílsko and Únětice are administrative parts of Údrnice.

Gallery

References

Villages in Jičín District